Aminata Coulibaly (born ) is a retired French female volleyball player, playing as an outside hitter. She was part of the France women's national volleyball team.

She competed at the 2009 Women's European Volleyball Championship, and 2011 Women's European Volleyball Championship. On club level she played for ASPTT Mulhouse in 2009.

References

External links
http://it.abc.scoresway.hosted.core.optasports.com/www.cdatb.com?sport=volleyball&page=player&id=3333
http://www.dna.fr/sports/2013/02/23/le-retour-d-aminata
http://www.lalsace.fr/sport/2015/01/03/l-aspttm-entre-joie-et-malheur
http://www.savoirnews.net/Volley-ball-L-equipe-de-volley
http://www.nantes.maville.com/sport/detail_-volley-ball-la-coupe-de-france-en-guise-de-reprise_52716-2075321_actu.Htm

1989 births
Living people
French women's volleyball players
Competitors at the 2009 Mediterranean Games
Place of birth missing (living people)
Mediterranean Games competitors for France